Ken Emselle (born 17 June 1944) is a former Australian rules footballer who played for Melbourne in the Victorian Football League (VFL) during the 1960s. His father Richie Emselle also played for Melbourne.

A rover, Emselle was a premiership player with Melbourne in 1964, starting on the bench in the grand final. In 1969, he played mostly with the Melbourne reserves, subsequently winning the Gardiner Medal. In 1970 he joined Prahran in the Victorian Football Association (VFA) and, during his four years at the club, Emselle won their best and fairest award twice and was their premiership captain in 1973.

In 2003 he was selected in Prahran's Team of the Century.

Growing up, he attended Northcote High School, in Melbourne.

He was also a maths teacher at Melbourne Grammar School.

External links

1944 births
Australian rules footballers from Victoria (Australia)
Melbourne Football Club players
Prahran Football Club players
Living people
Melbourne Football Club Premiership players
One-time VFL/AFL Premiership players